Harry McGregor or MacGregor may refer to:

J. Harry McGregor (1896–1958), member of the U.S. House of Representatives from Ohio
Harry McGregor (footballer), Scottish football goalkeeper
Harry MacGregor, a character in the film Father Goose